Slobodan Paunović (born 15 March 1944) is a Yugoslav former sports shooter. He competed in the 50 metre rifle three positions event at the 1968 Summer Olympics.

References

1944 births
Living people
People from Knić
Yugoslav male sport shooters
Olympic shooters of Yugoslavia
Shooters at the 1968 Summer Olympics